The Indian Journal of Medical Research is a peer-reviewed online open-access medical journal, available as a print-on-demand compilation. It is published by Medknow Publications on behalf of the Indian Council of Medical Research. Since 1977, it has been published monthly with six issues per volume. The journal publishes original "technical and clinical studies related to health, ethical and social issues" in biomedical research as well as narrative and evidence-based review articles. The current editor-in-chief is Anju Sharma (Indian Council of Medical Research), who took up the position in January 2012 after previously having served in associate editor positions. In addition to regular issues, the journal publishes special issues and supplements, with the latter published under a different ISSN.

History
The journal was first established as a quarterly publication in July 1913, mostly continuing with this publication rate until it was made bimonthly in 1958 and then monthly in 1964. There was, however, a period during 1940 and then between 1943 and 1946 when it was published half-yearly. The number of issues per volume was reduced from 1977, with two volumes of six issues being published each year. In 1989, the journal was split into two parts: Section A dealt with publications on infectious diseases whilst biomedical research outside that area was published in Section B. These sections were re-merged from 1994 but with a new ISSN (0971-5916 replaced ), which remains in use today. The journal has been celebrating its centenary of publications between July 2012 and July 2013.

The inaugural editor of the journal was Sir Pardey Lukis (1857–1917), the Director-General of the Indian Medical Service (1910–1917), who served in both positions until his death.

Abstracting and indexing
The journal is abstracted and indexed in:
 EBSCO electronic databases
 MEDLINE/Index Medicus
 PubMed
 Pubmed Central
 Science Citation Index
According to the Journal Citation Reports, the journal has a 2012 impact factor of 2.061, ranking it 101st out of 135 journals in the category "Immunology," 38th out of 151 journals in the category "Medicine, General & Internal," and 70th out of 121 journals in the category "Medicine, Research & Experimental."

See also
 Open access in India

References

External links
 
 Old website 

Monthly journals
Publications established in 1913
English-language journals
General medical journals
Medknow Publications academic journals
1913 establishments in India
Academic journals associated with learned and professional societies of India